Bring It On 7 : Cheer or Die is a 2022 American made-for-television cheerleading comedy slasher film that aired on Syfy on October 8, 2022. The film stars Kerri Medders, Tiera Skovbye and Missi Pyle. It is the seventh installment of the Bring It On series of cheerleading films, following Bring It On: Worldwide Cheersmack (2017).

The film differs from its predecessors in that it partially ditches the series' usual comedic tone and incorporates more horror elements, although its final rating was PG-13. It was released to DVD and Digital on September 27, ahead of its televised premiere. The film received negative reviews upon its physical release.

Synopsis 
When Abby and her Diablos teammates are forbidden from doing any risky cheer stunts by their overly cautious school, they fear that they will be laughed out of the upcoming regional cheer competition. The squad comes up with a plan to choreograph a winning routine in secret at a nearby abandoned school. Once at the school to rehearse, one by one, the cheerleaders begin to disappear. By the time they realize they're locked inside with a killer, it may be too late for any of them to survive.

Cast 
Kerri Medders as Abby
Tiera Skovbye as McKayla Miller
Missi Pyle as Principal Simmons
Megan Best as Sandra Pollack / Young Simmons
Alten Wilmot as Mateo
Alexandra Beaton as Regan
Sierra Holder as Jackie
Sam Robert Muik as Quincy
Alec Carlos as Danny Jefferies
Marlowe Zimmerman as Paige Simmons
Makena Zimmerman as Evee Simmons
Callista Begin as Paige / Evee Simmons (Age 12)
Scarlett Smith as Paige / Evee Simmons (Age 5)
Erika Prevost as Tori
Madison MacIsaac as Sydney
Rudy Borgonia as Silent Sol / Quiet Sol
Samuel Braun as Scott Becker
Shannon Guile as Diablo Mascot
Jared Khalifa as Diablo Mascot / Cheerleader
Gino Anania as Evan Wolf
Aidan Ritchie as Grunchy Bus Driver
Robert Allen as Football Coach
Jahron Wilson as Skeleton
Cassandra Potenza as Captain Becca
Sara Angelica as Larissa
Jerni Stewart as Candace

Production 
The film was first announced by Syfy on May 14, 2021, with its official title being revealed on December 16. Filming took place in Winnipeg, Canada, during the COVID-19 pandemic.

Reception 
Reception towards Bring It On: Cheer or Die has been largely negative. The film scored 20% on Rotten Tomatoes based on five reviews, while Commonsense Media gave it a two-star review.

Spooky Sarah Says gave it 2.5 out of 5, stating that "it is a popcorn-type film to watch in a time when most horror is so heavily centered around trauma and grief". Paul Lê of Bloody Disgusting awarded the movie 1.5 skulls out of 5, praising its premise and some of its stunt work, but criticizing the acting, as well as both its comedy and slasher elements, which he described as lacking due to the PG-13 rating. He concluded the review by saying, "This oddball sequel struggles to find a balance between its roots and its vision, only causing the movie to have no real identity in the end". Independent critic Josh Batchelder gave the film 1 of 5 stars, describing the script as "desperate for a laugh" and criticizing the "overuse of slo-mo".

Donatobom on IGN awarded the movie a 3/10 and described it as "not to their liking", stating that it was painfully disappointing and "deflated quicker than Pennywise's balloons against a rocket launcher explosion". In a mixed review, Chris Catt from Creepy Catalog described the film as "not a very good movie", citing its lack of blood and speculating that it was meant as an attempt to revive a franchise that was "fading away". However, he ended the review by stating that he "did kind of enjoy" the film despite its flaws. In a more optimistic review, Melis Amber of Geek Girl Authority described the movie as "the OK kind of terrible", praising its climax and campy dialogue, but criticizing its "sluggish middle".

References

External links 
 

2022 films
2020s slasher films
2020s comedy horror films
American slasher films
American sequel films
Cheerleading films
Bring It On (film series)
Beacon Pictures films
Films about Halloween
Films impacted by the COVID-19 pandemic
Films set in 2002
Films set in 2022
Films set in 2023
Films shot in Winnipeg
Universal Pictures direct-to-video films
Direct-to-video horror films
Direct-to-video sequel films
Syfy original films